Plácido Ramón de Torres (1847–1910), who used the alias Rosendo Fernandez, was a prolific Spanish stamp forger.

References

Further reading
 "Tracing a Spanish Forger's Footprints: Part 1 - The CSA Stamps and supposed Moens and Scott Forgeries" by Gerhard Lang-Valchs in  Espana, Journal of the Spanish Study Circle, Vol. 61 No. 1 (Spring 2020), pp. 15-24.

External links 

http://torres.ephilately.de/
http://torres.ephilately.de/fantasy_stamps
http://stampforgeries.com/forged-stamps-of-newfoundland-1866-1879/

1847 births
1910 deaths
Stamp forgers
Spanish counterfeiters